Yoo-hoo is an American brand of chocolate-flavored beverage that was created by Natale Olivieri in Garfield, New Jersey, in 1928 and is currently manufactured by Keurig Dr Pepper. As of 2019, the drink is primarily made from water, high-fructose corn syrup and whey.

History
Natale Olivieri started bottling carbonated fruit drinks in the mid-1920s. However, when he attempted to bottle a chocolate drink, he found that it would soon spoil.  Observing his wife canning fruits and vegetables, he asked her to use the same heat processing techniques with his chocolate drink. He began bottling the pasteurized chocolate drink named Yoo-Hoo at 133 Farnham Avenue, Garfield, New Jersey, in 1928.
In the 1940s, Thomas Giresi opened a bottling plant in Batesburg, South Carolina, for distribution of Yoo-hoo. In the 1960s, an advertising campaign tried to appeal to an older public for the drink, and featured Yogi Berra and his New York Yankees teammates. Berra, in a pin-striped business suit, drinks a bottle of Yoo-hoo, lifts it next to his cheek, and says with a smile, "It's Me-He for Yoo-Hoo!"

BBC Industries purchased the rights to Yoo-hoo sometime in the 1950s and retained ownership until 1976, when it sold the brand to Iroquois Brands. Yoo-hoo was sold again in 1981 to a group of private investors, which owned the brand until 1989, when it was sold to the French conglomerate Pernod Ricard.

In 2001, Pernod Ricard sold Yoo-hoo to Cadbury Schweppes, with production responsibilities falling to CS's Mott's group and marketing and advertising responsibilities under Snapple. They heightened awareness of the once-popular beverage.

The drink company's headquarters are in Tarrytown, New York, with plants in Carlstadt, New Jersey, and Aspers, Pennsylvania. An Opelousas, Louisiana, location closed in 2009. At one time, Yoo-hoo owned several other chocolate milk brands as well, including Choc-Ola, Brownie, Cocoa Dusty, and Chocolate Soldier. 

In May 2008, Cadbury-Schweppes split into the Cadbury candy business and the Dr Pepper Snapple Group soft drink firm, with the latter taking over Yoo-hoo.

In 2010, a legal suit was brought against the Dr Pepper Snapple Group in New York state by Timothy Dahl. The suit alleged that the Dr Pepper Snapple Group engaged in misleading advertising as to nutritional makeup of Yoo-hoo. Papers filed by Dahl claimed that the drink "contains dangerous, unhealthy, non-nutritious partially hydrogenated oil". Further, he stated that the drink "contains virtually no milk and instead is mostly water, sugars, milk by-products and chemicals." However, Motts LLP, which made the drink during this time said the drink contains "seven vitamins and minerals and no preservatives" and they stood by their product.

An ABC News article mentioned that on a papal visit to Denver, a variety of sources reported that Pope John Paul II liked Yoo-hoo after a Vatican spokesman mentioned that the Pope wanted "a couple of cases of that American chocolate drink he likes" on board his plane. As popes do not give commercial endorsements, a subsequent statement from his spokesman denied that the pontiff had any particular preference among American milk drinks.

As of early February 2019, Yoo-hoo is made from water, high fructose corn syrup, whey (from milk), and less than 2% of: cocoa (alkali process), nonfat dry milk, natural and artificial flavors, sodium caseinate (from milk), corn syrup solids, calcium phosphate, dipotassium phosphate, palm oil, guar gum, xanthan gum, mono and diglycerides, salt, spice, soy lecithin, niacinamide (vitamin B3), sucralose, vitamin A palmitate, riboflavin (vitamin B2), and vitamin D3.

In December 2022, musician Ye appeared on the program InfoWars, during which he produced a net and a bottle of Yoo-hoo and mocked former Israeli prime minister Benjamin Netanyahu, whose surname he stated sounds like "net and Yoo-hoo".

Flavors

Yoo-hoo began introducing new flavors to its lineup in 1995, including chocolate-coconut, chocolate-mint, chocolate-banana, and chocolate-strawberry. Yoo-hoo's other flavors have included vanilla, strawberry, cookies & cream, chocolate peanut butter, and chocolate caramel. The Double Fudge, banana, and Island Coconut flavors were discontinued.

See also

 List of chocolate beverages

References

External links

Yoo-hoo.com
Dr Pepper Snapple Group

Products introduced in 1928
Carlstadt, New Jersey
Chocolate drinks
Keurig Dr Pepper brands
Soft drinks
1928 establishments in New Jersey
Garfield, New Jersey